John Jacobs may refer to:
John C. Jacobs (1838–1894), New York politician
John H. Jacobs (1847–1934), pioneer of Michigan sandstone industry
John Jacobs (English golfer) (1925–2017), European Tour player and internationally known golf coach and instructor
Johnny Jacobs (1916–1982), American television announcer
John Jacobs (American golfer) (born 1945), PGA Tour and Champions Tour player
John Jacobs (activist) (1947–1997), SDS member and "weatherman"
John Jacobs (evangelist) (born 1959), best known for his role in Christian ministries that employ feats of strength
John Jacobs (producer), American film and television producer
John E. Jacobs (1903–1971), American educator
John Hornor Jacobs (born 1971), American author

See also
Jack Jacobs (disambiguation)
Jon Jacobs (disambiguation)
John Jacob (disambiguation)